D.M. Oberman Manufacturing Co. Building, also known as the Oberman and Company Building, is a historic building located at Springfield, Greene County, Missouri. It was built in 1917, and expanded through 1925.  It is a three-story, rectangular brick building on a concrete foundation, built in the Daylight Factory style.  It has a flat roof with corbelled brick cornice and flat parapet.

The building housed a garment factory and closed in 1949.

It was listed on the National Register of Historic Places in 2002.

References

Industrial buildings and structures on the National Register of Historic Places in Missouri
Industrial buildings completed in 1917
Buildings and structures in Springfield, Missouri
National Register of Historic Places in Greene County, Missouri
Textile mills in the United States
1917 establishments in Missouri